Gatecrasher, in comics, may refer to:

 Gatecrasher (Marvel Comics), a Marvel Comics character and leader of Technet
 Gatecrasher (Black Bull Entertainment), the first title from Black Bull Entertainment, a short-lived division of Wizard Entertainment

See also
Gatecrasher (disambiguation)